Raymond Gesteland is an American geneticist, currently Distinguished Professor Emeritus at University of Utah.  He received his Ph.D. at Harvard University in Biochemistry and his B.S. and M.S. at the University of Wisconsin, also in Biochemistry.

References

Year of birth missing (living people)
Living people
University of Utah faculty
American geneticists
Harvard University alumni
University of Wisconsin–Madison alumni